= Sea Typhoon =

Sea Typhoon may refer to:

- A typhoon that occurs in the sea
- A carrier variant of the Hawker Typhoon
- A carrier variant of the Eurofighter Typhoon
